

Zakariya Essabar (April 3, 1977 - c. November 2001) was, according to the governments of the United States, Germany, and other countries, a member of al-Qaeda and an associate of many of the organizers of the September 11 attacks.

Born on April 3, 1977 in Morocco, Essabar moved to Germany in 1997, and studied medical technology in college in Hamburg in 1998. Through the Muslim religious community there he met Ramzi bin al-Shibh and other members of the Hamburg cell. Essabar quickly became more religious while in Germany. He lived for some time at the Hamburg cell apartment.

After being radicalized in 1999, Essabar trained in Afghanistan where he learned combat skills and passport alteration. Ramzi bin al-Shibh later said that Essabar delivered the cryptic message from Khalid Sheikh Mohammed, indicating the date that the September 11 attacks would be carried out, although bin al-Shibh's claim is in doubt. Essabar may not have known the significance of the date, but he did relay the message. The truth of bin al-Shibh's claims is in doubt, due to "inconsistent statements". Despite a German arrest warrant issued a month after the attacks, Essabar was not captured and, according to al-Qaeda, was later killed in Afghanistan.

See also
Planning of the September 11 attacks

References

External links
 The Final 9/11 Commission Report

Essabar, Zakariyah
Year of death uncertain
People associated with the September 11 attacks
1977 births
Possibly living people
Hamburg cell